Margarita Vargas Núñez (born 12 May 1995) is a Bolivian footballer who plays as a midfielder for Mundo Futuro and the Bolivia women's national team.

Early life
Vargas hails from the Santa Cruz Department.

Club career
On 18 August 2019, Vargas won the Simón Bolívar Women's Cup playing for Mundo Futuro-Oriente Petrolero and through that victory the team qualified for the 2019 Copa Libertadores Femenina.

International career
Vargas played for Bolivia at senior level in the 2018 Copa América Femenina.

References

1995 births
Living people
Women's association football midfielders
Bolivian women's footballers
People from Santa Cruz Department (Bolivia)
Bolivia women's international footballers
Oriente Petrolero players
Place of birth missing (living people)